Public drinking fountains in Philadelphia, Pennsylvania, United States, have been built and used since the 19th century. Various reform-minded organizations in the city supported public drinking fountains as street furniture for different but overlapping reasons.  One was the general promotion of public health, in an era of poor water and typhoid fever. Leaders of the temperance movement such as the Woman's Christian Temperance Union saw free, clean water as a crucial alternative to beer.  Emerging animal welfare organizations, notably the Society for the Prevention of Cruelty to Animals, wanted to provide water to the dogs and working horses of the city on humanitarian grounds, which is why Philadelphia's drinking fountains of the era often include curb-level troughs that animals could reach.

History

Background

Philadelphia suffered multiple yellow fever epidemics in the 1790s. The Philadelphia Watering Committee, formally the Joint Committee on Bringing Water to the City, was founded in 1797–98 with the mission of constructing a public water system to combat the disease. Scottish-born architect Benjamin Henry Latrobe, famous for being the archetect of the United States Capitol building, designed the Philadelphia system in which an underground brick aqueduct carried drinking water from the Schuylkill River to Centre Square, now the site of Philadelphia City Hall. There, twin steam pumps propelled the water into a tank in the tower of the pumping house, from which gravity distributed it throughout the city via wooden water mains (cored logs). Completed in January 1801, this was the first citywide gravity-fed public water system in the United States.

Latrobe's chief draftsman, Frederick Graff, designed a "T"-shaped wooden fire hydrant in 1802, that featured "a drinking fountain on one side and a 4-1/2-inch water main on the other." The hydrants were installed along every major street of the city.

Latrobe's Greek Revival pumping house and the gardens surrounding it became a major attraction. Graff was promoted to manager of the Water Works in 1805, and designed the fountain for Centre Square. The Watering Committee commissioned sculptor William Rush to create a statue, Allegory of the Schuylkill River, to be its centerpiece. Better known as Water Nymph with Bittern, it was carved from pine and painted white (in imitation of marble).  The first public fountain in Philadelphia was unveiled in August 1809.

Drinking fountains
The idea of purpose-built drinking fountains was relatively novel. The first public drinking fountains in England appeared in Liverpool in 1854, through the efforts of Charles Pierre Melly, and that city had 43 in total by 1858.  The first in London was a granite basin attached to the gates of St Sepulchre-without-Newgate, funded by Samuel Gurney and his Metropolitan Drinking Fountain and Cattle Trough Association in 1859.

A spring-fed public drinking fountain was erected in 1854, along the Wissahickon Creek opposite Chestnut Hill. It was described in 1884 as:

The first fountain, so called, stands upon the side of the road on the west side of the Wissahickon ... It is claimed that this is the first drinking fountain erected in the county of Philadelphia outside of the Fairmount Water-Works. A clear, cold, mountain spring is carried by a spout, covered with a lion's head, from a niche in a granite front, with pilasters and pediment into a marble basin. The construction bears the date 1854 ... Upon a slab above the niche are cut the words "Pro bono publico"; beneath the basin these, "Esto perpetua".

In the 1860s, philanthropic groups and governments across the United States began to fund the building of water fountains, including the American Society for the Prevention of Cruelty to Animals in 1867 (in Union Square in New York City), and the Philadelphia Fountain Society beginning in April 1869. New fountains in Philadelphia proved immediately successful. They quickly proved their "utility and absolute necessity;" by September 1869 the Fountain Society had constructed 12, and the Pennsylvania branch of the ASPCA (PSPCA) had built another 5. As of 1880, the Philadelphia Fountain Society recorded 50 fountains serving approximately 3 million people and 1 million horses and other animals.  Reformers continued installing such fountains throughout Philadelphia into the 1940s. Many remain.

In 2015, Philly Voice reported on plans to re-establish a system of public drinking fountains in the city.

Sponsors

Philadelphia Fountain Society 

The earliest and most prolific fountain-building organization was the Philadelphia Fountain Society, headed by medical doctor and art collector Wilson Cary Swann (18061876) and formally incorporated on April 21, 1869, with the stated mission of developing water fountains and water troughs for Philadelphia. "[O]ur object", wrote Swann, "is the erection and maintenance in this city of public drinking fountains for the health and refreshment of the people of Philadelphia and the benefit of dumb animals".

The society hoped that water fountains would directly improve quality-of-life for workers and working animals in the city, and indirectly promote temperance; Swann felt that "the lack of water for workers and animals led to intemperance and crime", and that drinking fountains positioned around the city would help "workers quench their thirst in public instead of entering local taverns".  Some of Swann's arguments may have been derived from the like-minded London Metropolitan Drinking Fountain and Cattle Trough Association, established in 1859.

The fountains themselves were intended to be more functional than decorative, although many of them incorporate work by significant architects and sculptors.  The society reached out to Philadelphians, advertising $5 for an annual membership, or $150 for a lifetime membership.

The society's first fountain went up in April 1869, adjacent to Washington Square, at 7th and Walnut Streets. A cast iron eagle perched on top, and below the plaque were two troughs, one for horses, one for dogs. (It was relocated to the south side of the square in 1916.) That same year, work began on two fountains for the 500 block of Chestnut Street, in front of Independence Hall. Prominent citizens such as John Wanamaker and Anthony Joseph Drexel provided funding to the society, and by July there were five operational fountains. Two years later, forty three fountains were managed by the society. The society installed three fountains on Rittenhouse Square, the first outside the iron fence at the square's northwest corner; the others within the iron fence at its northeast and southeast corners. Persistent flooding around the fountains created a nuisance, and the society removed them by 1884.

Swann handled a large portion of the society's work, and by 1874 it had erected 73 fountains. On April 17, 1874, Adelaide Neilson performed a concert to benefit the society at the Academy of Music.

The society had challenges.  While rapidly constructing new fountains, it struggled to fund ongoing maintenance.  In the 1870s, the city budgeted some money for upkeep, but that practice was ended by 1880.  The city was hard on its drinking fountains.  That first fountain at 7th and Walnut, which was "at all times surrounded by a thirsty crowd" as of 1896, had its iron eagle "blown over" to land on a boy and break his arm, resulting in civil damages, then its fortified replacement eagle was squarely broken off by a tree branch.

The destruction of fountains by boys and men with vandalistic tendencies, has to be constantly watched for and guarded against.  Truck drivers and dragmen with heavy wagons also, by their carelessness, damage the fountains, and it is no uncommon thing for a fountain to be entirely knocked over by the pole of a brewery wagon ... the majority of the fountains ... erected now-a-days, are built low down, below the range of a wagon pole.

Swann died in 1876.  By 1892, the number of fountains managed by the society had declined to 60. That year, Swann's wife died and left $80,000 to the society, as well as $25,000 for the construction of a fountain in his memory. By 1910, the number of horses in Philadelphia was decreasing as automobiles and streetcars gained in popularity, decreasing the need for fountains. After the completion of its last grand project, the Swann Memorial Fountain in Logan Circle in 1924, the society ceased building fountains. At its peak, the society had managed 82 fountains. It still exists as a grant-providing organisation.

Society for the Prevention of Cruelty to Animals 
The Fountain Society was linked to the Pennsylvania branch of the newly formed American Society for the Prevention of Cruelty to Animals, co-founded in June 1868 by Colonel Mark Richards Muckle of the Public Ledger.  The two had shared motivations, and Swann was involved in both. As of September 1869, press reports claimed "a very commendable rivalry in the erection of drinking fountains for man and beast will spring up between those two admirable associations", the Fountain Society with twelve in operation so far, and the Pennsylvania Society for the Prevention of Cruelty to Animals (PSPCA) credited with five, all fountains which had "proven their utility and absolute necessity" with more to come. Some of these featured a curb-level trough for small animals, and a separate drinking fountain for people.

By 1869, the activist Caroline Earle White had grown frustrated with her exclusion from any decision-making role in the PSPCA, which she had helped to found. She created a Women's Branch, essentially an auxiliary, which also independently commissioned the construction of public drinking fountains and horse troughs. White founded the American Anti-Vivisection Society in Philadelphia in 1883. She created its monthly magazine, Journal of Zoöphily, in 1892, and worked as editor for 25 years.

Women's Pennsylvania Society for the Prevention of Cruelty to Animals
White fully broke away from the PSPCA in 1899, founding the independent Women's Pennsylvania Society for the Prevention of Cruelty to Animals, or WPSPCA. The WPSPCA became co-publisher of Journal of Zoöphily, which promoted its good works. White was assisted by the efforts and financial support of the WPSPCA's vice-president, Annie L. Lowry, the childless widow of a successful Philadelphia lawyer. Lowry sponsored horse fountains at Walnut & Dock Streets and 8th & Porter Streets, and more were erected in her memory. Lowry made $58,000 in bequests to the WPSPCA in her 1908 will, including $10,000 "for erecting fountains in Philadelphia for horses and smaller animals," and $20,000 to establish the first animal shelter in the United States.
 
A crusade is being conducted in Philadelphia, and has been for six years past, by the members of the Women's Pennsylvania Society for the Prevention of Cruelty to Animals.
In 1906, Mrs. Bradbury Bedell, a member of the Women's Society who had long been active in seeking better conditions for animals in Philadelphia, and the late Mrs. A. L. Lowry, another woman who for years had sought successfully to aid in the comfort of the dumb beasts, debated over the filthiness of many of the water troughs located around the city. They made personal appeals in many cases to saloon keepers where they found trough conditions especially flagrant. Sometimes their efforts were successful, and again the women's appeals were passed by unnoticed.

Then the thought came to them that the society could in time establish sufficient stations to crush out the horse trough evil, and the campaign was started. In six years the results have been even more than the originators had anticipated. To-day the society owns forty fountains and troughs throughout the city. Conditions at many other fountains have been greatly improved, and horse owners have been aroused to the danger.

The city authorities have cheerfully aided the Women's Society here by furnishing the supply of water free for all the stations and in other ways. Many heads of stores and establishments which have a large supply of horses have also responded to the society's efforts on behalf of the horse. They know what it means from a commercial as well as a humane standpoint.

As of 1928 the WPSPCA still ran a veterinary hospital in the city, an animal refuge, owned and maintained 50 street fountains open all year, and put up additional seasonal horse-watering stations in the city from May through November.

Temperance organizations 
The Woman's Christian Temperance Union also commissioned fountains.

The local membership of the Sons of Temperance funded a drinking fountain, originally installed under a pergola at the 1876 Centennial Exposition and later moved to Independence Square in 1877.  As advertised, it provided ICE WATER FREE TO ALL.

Also for the 1876 exposition the German-American sculptor Herman Kirn produced the elaborate Catholic Total Abstinence Union Fountain.  This included five figures, Moses in the middle, and sixteen drinking fountains installed into granite pedestals.

Notable drinking fountains 
Some entries in this table overlap the entries in Drinking fountains in the United States.  Neither table is an exhaustive list.

Unlocated or destroyed drinking fountains

See also 
 National Humane Alliance fountains
 Temperance fountain

Notes

References

Sources 

 
 
 

  
 
 
 

Drinking fountains in the United States
History of Philadelphia
Outdoor sculptures in Philadelphia
Philadelphia Register of Historic Places
Public art in Pennsylvania
Street furniture
Temperance movement
Tourist attractions in Philadelphia